Pentalenolactone F synthase (PEND (gene), PNTD (gene), PTLD (gene)) is an enzyme with systematic name pentalenolactone-D,2-oxoglutarate:oxygen oxidoreductase. This enzyme catalyses the following chemical reaction

 pentalenolactone D + 2 2-oxoglutarate + 2 O2  pentalenolactone F + 2 succinate + 2 CO2 + H2O (overall reaction)
(1a) pentalenolactone D + 2-oxoglutarate + O2  pentalenolactone E + succinate + CO2 + H2O
(1b) pentalenolactone E + 2-oxoglutarate + O2  pentalenolactone F + succinate + CO2

Pentalenolactone F synthase contains Fe(II), and ascorbate is needed for its action.

References

External links 
 

EC 1.14.11